Cemil Sarıbacak (born 1927) was a Turkish wrestler. He competed in the men's freestyle bantamweight at the 1952 Summer Olympics.

References

External links
  

1927 births
Possibly living people
Turkish male sport wrestlers
Olympic wrestlers of Turkey
Wrestlers at the 1952 Summer Olympics
Place of birth missing